The Medfield Social Library (est.1786) was a proprietary library in Medfield, Massachusetts. It incorporated in 1809. By 1816 it consisted of some 700 volumes, among them The Panoplist, Mary Pilkington's Mirror for Females, Susanna Rowson's Invisible Rambler, Claude-Étienne Savary's Letters on Egypt, Scott's Lessons in Reading, and George Staunton's Embassy to China. Librarians included "Dr. Prentiss." As of the 1880s "a remnant" of the library was reportedly "stored at the town farm."

Further reading
 A catalogue of books in the circulating library in Medfield, with the names of the proprietors of said library. Medfield, Mass.: 1791.
 A catalogue of books, together with the Constitution of the incorporated Library Society in Medfield, and the names of the proprietors by Library Society in Medfield. Dedham, Mass.: Printed by Herman Mann, 1810.
 Medfield Library [catalog]. Dedham, Mass.: Printed at the Dedham Gazette office, 1816.

References

1786 establishments in Massachusetts
Libraries in Norfolk County, Massachusetts
Subscription libraries in the United States